Stachytarpheta steyermarkii is a species of plant in the family Verbenaceae. It is endemic to Ecuador.  Its natural habitat is subtropical or tropical moist montane forests.

References

Endemic flora of Ecuador
steyermarkii
Vulnerable plants
Taxonomy articles created by Polbot
Plants described in 1947